Aethes sonorae, the streaked aethes moth, is a species of moth of the family Tortricidae. It was described by Walsingham in 1884. It is found in North America, where it has been recorded from Mexico (Sonora) and the southern United States.

References

sonorae
Moths described in 1884
Moths of North America